Louis Henri, comte de Gueydon (22 November 1809 – 1 December 1886) was a vice admiral in the French Navy, and the first governor of Algeria under the Third Republic.

Family 
De Gueydon was born in Granville, Manche. His family were nobles of Italian extraction. His son Paul de Gueydon also became a vice-admiral; his son-in-law Auguste de Penfentenyo became a counter admiral; his grandson Hervé de Penfentenyo became a vice-admiral and won the Grand Croix of the Légion d'honneur.

Naval career
De Gueydon came third in the entrance exam for the naval school at Angoulême in 1823; he graduated first in his class. On 31 December 1830 became an ensign on the brig Faucon off the coast of Brazil. He was made governor of Martinique in 1853, and Maritime Prefect of Lorient in 1858 and Brest in 1859. In 1861 he was promoted to vice-admiral and replaced Louis Édouard Bouët-Willaumez as commander of the escadre d'évolution, for exercises). In 1863 he became vice-president of the consultative committee for the colonies and president of the admiralty council. After the fall of the Second Empire in September 1870, the naval minister in the Government of National Defense, admiral Léon Martin Fourichon, split the North Sea fleet and gave De Gueydon command of one half.  On 28 January 1871, he received the Grand Croix of the Légion d'honneur.

Political career
On 29 March 1871, De Gueydon was named civil governor of French Algeria, which had been in revolt for several months. He declared martial law across much of the colony and used severe measures to suppress the revolt. He compared the Kabyles to the Communards of Paris and advised, "Agir comme à Paris; on juge et on désarme".  A decree of 14 September partly abolished the "Arab bureaus", reordered the administration of Kabylie, and reorganised 100,000 hectares of land for the influx of colonising refugees from Alsace-Lorraine. On his advice, title would be granted to colonists who engaged to reside on the land for nine years. In 1872 he summed up the political situation: "We must face the fact, that what the politicians and most of the colonists want, is the dominance of those elected by the French population, and the crushing, the enslavement even, of the native population."

In the 1885 legislative election, De Gueydon was elected from Manche to the National Assembly as a Royalist. He had failed to be elected to the Senate earlier that year.

Works 
 La vérité sur la Marine, 1849
 Organisation du personnel à bord, 1852
 Tactique navale, 1867
 L'équité politique, 1871

Namesakes 
 Azeffoun in Algeria was formerly named Port-Gueydon
 Gueydon, an armoured cruiser, was launched in 1899.

References
  Le livre d'Or de l'Algérie, Narcisse Faucon, Challamel et Cie Éditeurs Librairie Algérienne et Coloniale, 1889.
 Histoire de la France coloniale, Agora, Armand Colin.
 Fafo Bejaia

Notes

1809 births
1886 deaths
People from Manche
Counts of the Second French Empire
French people of Italian descent
Politicians from Normandy
French monarchists
Members of the 4th Chamber of Deputies of the French Third Republic
Governors general of Algeria
French Governors of Martinique
French Navy admirals
Grand Croix of the Légion d'honneur